Celta de Vigo participated in La Liga, Copa del Rey and the UEFA Cup. Finishing just shy of the UEFA Champions League positions, Celta failed to repeat their cup runs of previous seasons, dropping out of both Copa del Rey and the UEFA Cup in the second rounds.

Squad

Left club during season

La Liga

League table

Results by round

Matches

Statistics

Players statistics

External links
   FootballSquads - Celta Vigo 2001-02

RC Celta de Vigo seasons
Celta